Arippara disticha is a species of snout moth. It was described by Alfred Jefferis Turner in 1904 and is found in Australia.

References

Pyralini
Moths described in 1904